Jan Bo Viktorsson (born July 27, 1964 in Stockholm, Sweden) is a retired Swedish ice hockey player. Viktorsson played for his home town club Djurgårdens IF during most of his career, except for two seasons in Austrian side Graz EC. He played a total of 584 Elitserien games for Djurgården and scored 330 points before ending his career in 1999. Viktorsson is currently working for Djurgården as a salesman.

Career statistics

Regular season and playoffs

International

References

External links

1964 births
Living people
Djurgårdens IF Hockey players
Ice hockey players at the 1992 Winter Olympics
Olympic ice hockey players of Sweden
Ice hockey people from Stockholm
Swedish ice hockey forwards